Joshua Swickard is an American model and actor. In 2017, he was cast in the role of Harrison Chase on the ABC soap opera General Hospital.

Early life
Swickard was born in Quincy, Illinois, to parents Bob, senior pastor at St. Matthew's United Methodist Church in Belleville, and Gina, a vocal coach. He has three sisters Elyssa Carlisle (who is married and has a son named Alistair), Kalia, and Elayna Swickard. He studied at Glenwood High School and attended the College of DuPage where he studied accounting for 2 years.
Then he modeled for about 6 years in Chicago.

Josh is a descendant of Daniel Zwigart, who landed in Philadelphia on the ship Betsey in 1765.

Career
Swickard is managed by Factor Chosen Chicago, and Wilhelmina Models. He started his modeling career in 2010, when he appeared in the Oh lala Magazine, and again in 2012. In 2013, he appeared in Q. He made his acting debut in 2015 by guest-starring in an episode of K.C. Undercover as a football dude. In the same year, he landed the recurring role of Todd Stetson in another television series Liv and Maddie. In early 2017, he was cast in a film called Roped as Colton, which he confirmed on Instagram in September. In late 2017, Swickard was cast in the soap opera General Hospital as Harrison Chase. He debuted on February 21, 2018.

Personal life
In December 2018, Josh announced his engagement to girlfriend, actress Lauren York. The pair married on July 6, 2019. In 2021, the couple welcomed their first child together, a daughter, named Savannah Kaye Swickard.

Filmography

References

External links
 

American male film actors
American male television actors
American male models
Living people
Male actors from Illinois
People from Illinois
1992 births